The Reunification Highway, officially known as the Pyongyang-Kaesong Motorway, is a controlled-access highway in North Korea. It connects the capital Pyongyang to the Joint Security Area at the Korean Demilitarized Zone via Sariwon and Kaesong. The distance to Seoul in South Korea is present on signs on the highway, although it is not possible to cross the border to South Korea.

It is 170 km long, with multiple paved lanes and several tunnels. Tourists have reported that there is very light traffic, as well as multiple checkpoints and tank traps.

Construction began in 1987 in preparation for the 13th World Festival of Youth and Students to be held in Pyongyang in 1989. The project was economically ill-advised because North Korea had hitherto consistently focused on developing railway links for transport, diminishing the need for new expressways. Construction finished on April 15, 1992, the birthday of North Korea's president Kim Il-sung. Its name was chosen to promote the reunification of Korea. The entire highway is part of Asian Highway 1.

References

External links

Roads in North Korea
AH1